Vibha  is an Indian feminine given name. The Sanskrit word  has the meaning of "shining, bright".

See also 
 , for a list of people with the name

References

Indian feminine given names